The Choson Sinbo (Chosun Shinbo), also known by the name of its English edition The People's Korea, is a newspaper based in Japan, published in both Korean and Japanese. The name literally means 'Chosun (Korea) Newspaper'. It is published by the General Association of Korean Residents, a pro-North Korea representative body for Zainichi Koreans, who also run The People's Korea (PK), an English language news site.

When reporting from North Korea, Choson Sinbo journalist enjoy more freedoms than other foreign reporters and they have managed to publish exclusive stories on projects in the country and scoops on Japan–North Korea relations.

History
On November 4, 2020, it's reported that majority of its content are placed in a paywall scheme, which can complicate things since it can run into legal troubles with sanctions against North Korea.

Notable staff 
 Lee Hoesung, who wrote for the paper until 1969

See also 

 Rimjingang

References

External links 
 

 

Mass media in North Korea
Weekly newspapers published in Japan
Publications established in 1957
Korean-language newspapers
Communist newspapers
Zainichi Korean culture